Nithya Das is an Indian actress who works prominently in Malayalam cinema along with Malayalam and Tamil television series.

Career
Das was active in the film industry during the early-2000s. She started her career with the 2001 film Ee Parakkum Thalika, directed by Thaha and starring Dileep. After this successful film, she acted with Kalabhavan Mani in Kanmashi. Her other films in Malayalam include Balettan, Choonda, Hridayathil Sookshikkan, Nagaram, Soorya Kireedam and Nariman. She was selected from many applicants in a talent search program of the film industry. She acted in television serials in Surya TV, Kairali TV, Sun TV and Jaya TV. She makes a comeback to the Malayalam film industry after fourteen years through the movie Pallimani which will be released in 2023.

Personal life
Nithya Das married Arvind Singh Jamwal. Nithya met him in 2005 when she was traveling to Chennai on Indian Airlines and Arvind was a member of the flight crew. The couple have two children. They settled in Kashmir and then moved to Kozhikode.

Filmography

 All films in Malayalam language unless otherwise noted

Television
Series

Shows

References

External links 
 
 Nithya Das at MSI

Living people
Actresses in Malayalam cinema
Indian film actresses
Actresses from Kozhikode
21st-century Indian actresses
Indian television actresses
Actresses in Tamil television
Actresses in Malayalam television
Actresses in Telugu cinema
Actresses in Tamil cinema
Year of birth missing (living people)